Chemokine (C-C motif) ligand 15 (CCL15) is a small cytokine belonging to the CC chemokine family that is also known as leukotactin-1, MIP5 and HCC-2.  CCL15 is expressed in liver, small intestine, colon, and in certain leukocytes and macrophages of the lung. It is chemotactic for neutrophils, monocytes, and lymphocytes and elicits its effects by binding to cell surface chemokine receptors like CCR1 and CCR3.  The human CCL15 gene spans four exons and is located in a head-to-tail orientation on chromosome 17 with the gene of another CC chemokine known as CCL14.

References

External links
 CCL15 GeneCard

Cytokines